Rony Chowdhury (born 1 December 1995) is a Bangladeshi cricketer. He made his first-class debut for Chittagong Division in the 2016–17 National Cricket League on 2 October 2016. In May 2021, Chowdhury was named in Khelaghar Samaj Kallyan Samity's squad for the 2021 Dhaka Premier Division Twenty20 Cricket League tournament. He made his Twenty20 debut on 7 June 2021, for Khelaghar Samaj Kallyan Samity, and took two wickets in the match. He made his List A debut on 16 March 2022, for Khelaghar Samaj Kallyan Samity in the 2021–22 Dhaka Premier Division Cricket League.

References

External links
 

1995 births
Living people
Bangladeshi cricketers
Chittagong Division cricketers
Khelaghar Samaj Kallyan Samity cricketers
People from Chittagong